Beginning from its inception into statehood, New Jersey elected its representatives at-large instead of from individual districts.  This continued for most years until 1843, with the exception of the years 1799-1801, and 1813-1815 when they were elected in districts.  After 1843, New Jersey returned to district representation. Four at-large representatives were elected in 1789 until 1793 when a 5th representative was added. 6 seats were allocated beginning in 1803, continuing until at-large representation ceased in 1843.

List of members representing the district

References

 Congressional Biographical Directory of the United States 1774–present

At-large
Former congressional districts of the United States
At-large United States congressional districts
Constituencies established in 1789
1789 establishments in New Jersey
Constituencies disestablished in 1799
1799 disestablishments in New Jersey
Constituencies established in 1801
1801 establishments in New Jersey
Constituencies disestablished in 1813
1813 disestablishments in New Jersey
Constituencies established in 1815
1815 establishments in New Jersey
Constituencies disestablished in 1843
1843 disestablishments in New Jersey